Villamediana de Iregua is a village in the province and autonomous community of La Rioja, Spain.

Demographics

Population centres
 Villamediana de Iregua
 Puente Madre

References

Populated places in La Rioja (Spain)